James Gordon "Klepto" Holmes (March 31, 1906 – February 26, 1952) was an American football coach.  He was the sixth head football coach at Arlington State College—now known as the University of Texas at Arlington—serving for 16 seasons, in from 1935 to 1950, and compiling a record of 71–66–5. The school discontinued its football team after completion of the 1985 season.

Holmes died of a heart attack in 1952.

References

External links
 

1906 births
1952 deaths
American football tackles
Texas A&M Aggies football coaches
Texas A&M Aggies football players
Texas–Arlington Mavericks football coaches
High school football coaches in Texas
People from Grand Saline, Texas